Lyndon Lea (born 13 January 1969) is an English financier and investor, known for co-founding Lion Capital which specializes in making investments in the consumer sector. Notable previous and current consumer brands owned by Lion have included Weetabix, Jimmy Choo, Wagamama, Kettle Foods and AllSaints.

Early life
Lea was born in Morecambe, Lancashire, England. His mother was a hairdresser and his father was an engineer who loved travel . Lea spent his childhood growing up in South Africa, Botswana and moved at aged 13 to Canada, where he became a citizen. In 1990, after graduating in business administration from the University of Western Ontario, his career started in the mergers and acquisitions department of Goldman Sachs in New York working primarily on consumer deals. He returned to London in 1992 and, after a brief spell in the investment-banking division of Schroders, he was recruited with Neil Richardson, to start the European affiliate (Glenisla) of industry giant KKR. In 1998 he was spotted by Hicks, Muse, Tate & Furst and brought in to launch their new European business. At Hicks Muse he worked with consumer brands ranging from Mumm & Perrier-Jouet champagne brands to Typhoo tea and Branston Pickle. He also oversaw the flotations of Yell Group, the UK phone directories business, in 2003, and Premier Foods in 2004.

Lion Capital
In 2004, Lea gained prominence by separating the European business he ran from its ailing American parent, Hicks Muse. Along with Robert Darwent, his Hicks Muse colleague, Lea co-founded Lion Capital and turned Lion Capital into one of the best-known firms in the investment business. Lea and Lion have invested in over 100 consumer brands in Europe and North America. The company currently employs 30 investment executives. 
Lea is known for his hands-on investing style and his ownership of high-profile fashion brands such as Jimmy Choo, AllSaints and John Varvatos has made him a staple of the UK and New York press.  Not all of Lion's investments have been successful.  Notably, La Senza, which Lea admits was one of the riskier investments for Lion, was not successful.

Company holdings
Lea's career has been characterised by diverse company holdings including:

Sold Champagne Mumm & Perrier-Jouet in 2001 to Allied Domecq 
Bought Weetabix in 2004 for £640 million and sold 60% to Bright Food in 2012 in a deal valuing the company at £1.2 billion
Acquired Jimmy Choo in 2004 for £100 million and sold the company in 2007 for £225 million
Acquired Wagamama in 2005 for £102 million  and later sold the company for £215 million in 2011
Acquired Orangina in 2006 in partnership with the Blackstone Group and later sold the company for €2.6 billion in 2009 	
Acquired Kettle Foods in 2006 for $270 million and sold the company in 2010 for $615 million
Acquired HEMA in 2007 for a deal estimated to be worth €1.3 billion 
Acquired the Findus and Young’s brands in 2008 for £1.1 billion 
Acquired AS Adventure Group in 2008 for €263 million
Invested $80 million in American Apparel in 2009
Acquired Bumble Bee Foods for $980 million in 2010
Purchased Picard in 2010 for €1.5 billion 
Acquired AllSaints in 2011	 
Acquired Alain Afflelou in 2012 for €740 million 
Acquired John Varvatos in 2012
Acquired Good Hair Day in 2013 for £300 million

Lea has also served on the board of several public companies including Harry Winston, American Apparel, Yell Group and Premier Foods.

Personal life
In a personal capacity, Lea is an active supporter and advocate for Not For Sale, a charity that raises awareness of modern day slavery.

In August 2015, Lea married long-time girlfriend, model Sophie Dickens, whom he met at a charity polo match in 2010.

Lea is an avid polo player. His team Zacara, is named after his children. In July 2011 Zacara won the Veuve Clicquot Gold Cup for the British Open Polo Championship, at Cowdray Park, West Sussex. The following April, Lea's team also won the U.S. Open Polo Championship. In 2013, Lea's team again won the U.S. Open Championships, achieving back-to-back victories. This was followed later in 2013 by an undefeated sweep of the UK season in which Lea's team won the Queen's Cup and again won the Veuve Clicquot Gold Cup for the British Open Championship. In 2014, Zacara once again won the prestigious Cartier Queen's Cup. Lea owns a polo ranch in Santa Barbara, California  where he has reportedly hosted several lavish summer parties at his Californian beach house which have included entertainment from acts such as Cirque du Soleil and beautiful women.

Lea also studies Brazilian jiu-jitsu.

References 

1969 births
English bankers
English financial businesspeople
English financial company founders
English investors
English money managers
English polo players
Goldman Sachs people
Living people
Private equity and venture capital investors
University of Western Ontario alumni
Schroders people